Camborne Science and International Academy (formerly Camborne Science & Community College) is an academy school and sixth form in Camborne, Cornwall, England, UK. The school teaches 1,803 11- to 18-year-olds.

School 
When the school opened on 18 April 1956 it was known as Treswithian Secondary Modern and was equipped for the use of 508 pupils. It expanded to become Camborne School and Community College at the introduction of the Comprehensive school system, absorbing the disestablished Camborne Grammar School. In 2003 it gained specialist status as a Science College, and the name again changed to reflect this. In April 2011 the school attained academy status, and on 1 September 2011 the school was renamed as Camborne Science and International Academy (CSIA). Since then, the school has been extended with a £3.2 million Design Technology block, incorporating the Design Technology, Food Technology and Graphical Drawing subjects, and those related to them. As well as this, there has been a full refurbishment of the school’s main canteen, toilet facilities and of the Sixth Form area.

In September 2016, the school opened up a STEM centre for students who are gifted and talented in Science and Maths. This centre is called Nexus and is the first of its kind in the country. Nexus has developed links with universities such as Oxford. CSIA also has a sixth form for students in year 12 and 13.

In the most recent Ofsted inspection, the report concluded the school to be 'Good with outstanding features'.

It was announced by the government in March 2010 that the Cornwall Council, the school's Local Authority had secured £69m funding, a portion of which is rumoured to be used to rebuild the school on the current site of one of their sports' fields, although the funding was to have been made under the Building Schools for the Future (BSF) programme which was later cut back.

Location 
Although Camborne School is located within a ten-minute walk of the main town, it has two main fields and an athletics track. It shares a boundary with Camborne RFC, home to the town Rugby team, as well as - until 2010 - the Cornish Pirates.

Uniform 
The school has a uniform code which consists of an all-black blazer, black v-neck jumper, white shirt, school tie, trousers or a skirt and all black shoes (leather or leather look). A competition to design the logo and tie was held during April and May 2009, with proceeds from entries being donated to Children's hospice south west's Precious Lives Appeal, the school's charity of choice. As part of their work as a Community School, this competition was opened up to staff, students, parents and carers, and any other member of the local area who showed an active interest in the well-being of the town.

Leadership 
The school operates two separate Student Leadership Team systems, one for the VIth Form exclusively (The VIth Form Committee), and a Student Voice, representing the school as a whole. The two work together in many aspects of their duties that crossover between the Sixth Form and main school.

The VIth Form committee is led by a team of four students, all of which gain membership of the 'Student Voice'.

The 'Student Voice' is led by the student body, with an elected Chairperson, Vice Chairperson, Secretary and Treasurer.

Each Form Group elects two representatives, one of each gender. They then represent their form on a Year Council. Each Year Council in turn votes in two representatives for the Whole School Council, or the 'Student Voice'.

Full councils meet on a fortnightly basis and discuss a range of subjects from the uniform to use of the school budget. They also hold representation on various local bodies such as the Cornwall Youth Forum and the CPR Regeneration Forum. To date two students have been members of the United Kingdom Youth Parliament, representing the West Cornwall constituency.

Notable former pupils 
Brendon James, drummer of Thirteen Senses
Josh Matavesi, rugby player, Ospreys (rugby union) and Fiji national rugby union team
Tom Welham, lead guitarist of Thirteen Senses
Lewis Goldsworthy, cricketer

References

External links 

Official Website

Educational institutions established in 1956
1956 establishments in England
Secondary schools in Cornwall
Academies in Cornwall
Camborne